Esmeraldas Canton is a canton of Ecuador, located in the Esmeraldas Province.  Its capital is the town of Esmeraldas.  Its population at the 2001 census was 157,792.

Demographics
Ethnic groups as of the Ecuadorian census of 2010:
Afro-Ecuadorian  55.5%
Mestizo  37.4%
White  4.9%
Montubio  1.1%
Indigenous  0.7%
Other  0.3%

References

Cantons of Esmeraldas Province